Haßfurt station is a railway station in the municipality of Haßfurt, located in the Haßberge district in Bavaria, Germany.

References

Railway stations in Bavaria
Buildings and structures in Haßberge (district)